Lynnfield is the code name for a quad-core processor from Intel released in September 2009. It was sold in varying configurations as Core i5-7xx, Core i7-8xx or Xeon X34xx. Lynnfield uses the Nehalem microarchitecture and replaces the earlier Penryn based Yorkfield processor, using the same 45 nm process technology, but with a new memory and bus interface. The product code for Lynnfield is 80605, its CPUID value identifies it as family 6, model 30 (0106Ex).

Lynnfield is related to the earlier Bloomfield and Gainestown microprocessors, which are used in server and high-end desktop systems. The main difference between the two is Lynnfield's use of the LGA 1156 processor socket as opposed to the LGA 1366 socket used by Bloomfield and Gainestown processors. LGA 1156 processors include Direct Media Interface and PCI Express links, which Intel has previously connected to the processor with a dedicated northbridge chip, called the memory controller hub or I/O hub.

The Lynnfield series of processors does not include built-in Intel graphics.

The mobile version of Lynnfield is Clarksfield.

Brand names

See also 
 Nehalem (microarchitecture)
 Yorkfield (microprocessor)
 Clarksfield (microprocessor)
 List of Macintosh models grouped by CPU type

External links 
 Intel's Lynnfield Processor & its New Power Control Unit

References 

Intel_microprocessors